Houtsma is a Dutch surname. Notable people with the surname include:

 Alwin Houtsma, Dutch Paralympic swimmer
 Martijn Theodoor Houtsma (1851–1943), Dutch orientalist and professor

Dutch-language surnames